"Jingle Bells" is one of the best-known and most commonly sung American songs in the world. It was written by James Lord Pierpont (1822–1893) and published under the title "The One Horse Open Sleigh" in September 1857. It has been claimed that it was originally written to be sung by a Sunday school choir for Thanksgiving, or as a drinking song. Although it has no original connection to Christmas, it became associated with winter and Christmas music in the 1860s and 1870s, and it was featured in a variety of parlor song and college anthologies in the 1880s. It was first recorded in 1889 on an Edison cylinder; this recording, believed to be the first Christmas record, is lost, but an 1898 recording also from Edison Records survives.

History

Composition

James Lord Pierpont who was the uncle of JP
Morgan, wrote "One Horse Open Sleigh" in 1857 and claimed to be a drinking song (it was always performed in blackface) It didn't become a Christmas song until decades after it was first performed on Washington Street.
Pierpont, a supporter of the Confederacy, dedicated the song to John Ordway, an organizer of a minstrel blackface troupe called Ordway's Aeolians.
Also during 1857, some slaves were forced to wear
"Jingle Bells" in order to deter them from running for the freedom. 

It is an unsettled question where and when Pierpont originally composed the song that would become known as "Jingle Bells". A plaque at 19 High Street in the center of Medford Square in Medford, Massachusetts, commemorates the "birthplace" of "Jingle Bells", and claims that Pierpont wrote the song there in 1850, at what was then the Simpson Tavern. Previous local history narratives claim the song was inspired by the town's popular sleigh races during the 19th century.

"Jingle Bells" was originally copyrighted with the name "The One Horse Open Sleigh" on September 16, 1857.  The song was dedicated to John P. Ordway, Esq. The songwriting credit was listed as: "Song and Chorus written and composed by J. Pierpont."

The song was republished in 1859 by Oliver Ditson and Company, 277 Washington Street, Boston, with the new title "Jingle Bells; or, The One Horse Open Sleigh". The sheet music cover featured a drawing of sleigh bells around the title. Sleigh bells were strapped across the horse to make the jingle, jangle sound.

The song was first performed on September 15, 1857, at Ordway Hall in Boston by the blackface minstrel performer Johnny Pell. 

The song was in the then popular style or genre of "sleighing songs". Pierpont's lyrics are strikingly similar to lines from many other sleigh-riding songs that were popular at the time; researcher Kyna Hamill argued that this, along with his constant need for money, led him to compose and release the song solely as a financial enterprise: "Everything about the song is churned out and copied from other people and lines from other songs—there's nothing original about it."

By the time the song was released and copyrighted, Pierpont had relocated to Savannah, Georgia, to serve as organist and music director of that city's Unitarian Universalist Church, where his brother, Rev. John Pierpont Jr. served as minister. In August 1857, Pierpont married Eliza Jane Purse, the daughter of the mayor of Savannah. Pierpont remained in Savannah and never went back North.

The double-meaning of "upsot" was thought humorous, and a sleigh ride gave an unescorted couple a rare chance to be together, unchaperoned, in distant woods or fields, with all the opportunities that afforded. This "upset", a term Pierpont transposed to "upsot", became the climactic component of a sleigh-ride outing within the sleigh narrative.

Recordings and performances

James Lord Pierpont's 1857 composition "Jingle Bells" became one of the most performed and most recognizable secular holiday songs ever written, not only in the United States, but around the world. In recognition of this achievement, James Lord Pierpont was voted into the Songwriters Hall of Fame.

"Jingle Bells" was first recorded by Will Lyle on October 30, 1889, on an Edison cylinder, but no surviving copies are known to exist. The earliest surviving recording was made by the Edison Male Quartette in 1898, also on an Edison cylinder, as part of a Christmas medley titled "Sleigh Ride Party". In 1902, the Hayden Quartet recorded "Jingle Bells". The song became a Christmas favorite in the early twentieth century.

In 1943, Bing Crosby and the Andrews Sisters recorded "Jingle Bells" as Decca 23281 which reached No. 19 on the charts and sold over a million copies. In 1941, Glenn Miller and His Orchestra with Tex Beneke, Marion Hutton, Ernie Caceres, and the Modernaires on vocals had a No. 5 hit with "Jingle Bells" on RCA Victor, University 11353. In 1935, Benny Goodman and His Orchestra reached No. 18 on the charts with their recording of "Jingle Bells". In 1951, Les Paul had a No. 10 hit with a multi-tracked version on guitar. In 2001, House of Mouse version, sung by Wayne Allwine, Russi Taylor, and Bill Farmer. In 2006, Kimberley Locke had a No. 1 hit on the Billboard Adult Contemporary chart with a recording of the song.

First song in space
"Jingle Bells" was one of the first songs to broadcast from space, in a Christmas-themed prank by Gemini 6 astronauts Tom Stafford and Wally Schirra. While in space on December 16, 1965, they sent this report to Mission Control:

The astronauts then produced a smuggled harmonica and sleigh bells, and with Schirra on the harmonica and Stafford on the bells, broadcast a rendition of "Jingle Bells". The harmonica, shown to the press upon their return, was a Hohner "Little Lady", a tiny harmonica approximately one inch (2.5 cm) long, by 3/8 of an inch (1 cm) wide.

Lyrics
Music historian James Fuld notes that (as opposed to an adjective), "the word jingle in the title and opening phrase is apparently an imperative verb." In the winter in New England in pre-automobile days, it was common to adorn horses' harnesses with straps bearing bells as a way to avoid collisions at blind intersections, since a horse-drawn sleigh in snow produces almost no audible noise. The rhythm of the tune apparently mimics that of a trotting horse's bells; however, "jingle bells" is commonly interpreted to mean a certain kind of bell.

Jingle Bells
Dashing through the snow
In a one-horse open sleigh
O'er the fields we go
Laughing all the way
Bells on bob tail ring
Making spirits bright
What fun it is to ride and sing
A sleighing song tonight! Oh! 

Jingle bells, jingle bells,
Jingle all the way.
Oh! what fun it is to ride
In a one-horse open sleigh. Hey! 
Jingle bells, jingle bells,
Jingle all the way;
Oh! what fun it is to ride
In a one-horse open sleigh.
Although less well-known than the opening, the remaining verses depict high-speed youthful fun. In the second verse, the narrator takes a ride with a girl and loses control of the sleigh:
A day or two ago
I thought I'd take a ride
And soon, Miss Fanny Bright
Was seated by my side,
The horse was lean and lank
Misfortune seemed his lot
He got into a drifted bank
And then we got .
|: chorus :|

In the next verse (which is often skipped), he falls out of the sleigh and a rival laughs at him:
A day or two ago,
The story I must tell
I went out on the snow,
And on my back I fell;
A gent was riding by
In a one-horse open sleigh,
He laughed as there I sprawling lie,
But quickly drove away. Ah! 
|: chorus :|
In the last verse, after relating his experience, he gives advice to a friend to pick up some girls, find a faster horse, and take off at full speed:
Now the ground is white
Go it while you're young,
Take the girls tonight
and sing this sleighing song;
Just get a bobtailed bay
Two forty as his speed
Hitch him to an open sleigh
And crack! you'll take the lead.
|: chorus :|

Notes to lyrics

Original lyrics
The two first stanzas and chorus of the original 1857 lyrics differed slightly from those known today. It is unknown who replaced the words with those of the modern version. Underlined lyrics are the removed lyrics from the original version. Bold lyrics are the new lyrics in the current version.
Dashing thro' the snow,
In a one-horse open sleigh,
Laughing all the way;
Bells on bob tail ring,
Making spirits bright,
 (What fun it is) to ride and sing
A sleighing song tonight.

|: chorus :|
Jingle bells, jingle bells,
Jingle all the way;
Oh! what  (fun) it is to ride
In a one-horse open sleigh.

A day or two ago
I tho't I'd take a ride
And soon Miss Fannie Bright
Was seated by my side.
The horse was lean and lank
Misfortune seemed his lot
He got into a drifted bank
And  (then) we got upsot.

Melody

The original 1857 version of "Jingle Bells" featured a substantially different chorus. The progression of descending chords in the original refrain (A–E/G–Fm–C–D–A/E–E7–A; in Roman numeral analysis, I–V6–vi–V/vi–IV–I–V7–I) bears some resemblance to that of Pachelbel's Canon. The verses, on the other hand, have mostly the same melody (with some minor simplifications) in modern renditions as they did in 1857. The origin of the simpler, modern refrain is unknown, but it dates back at least 1898, when the oldest surviving phonograph recording of the song was released through Edison Records.

The "Jingle Bells" tune is used in French and German songs, although the lyrics are unrelated to the English lyrics. Both songs celebrate winter fun, as in the English version. The French song, titled "Vive le vent" ("Long Live the Wind"), was written by Francis Blanche and contains references to Father Time, Baby New Year, and New Year's Day. There are several German versions of "Jingle Bells", including Roy Black's "Ein kleiner weißer Schneemann".

Parodies and homages

Like many simple, catchy, and popular melodies, "Jingle Bells" is often the subject of parody. "Jingle Bells, Batman Smells" has been a well-known parody since the mid-1960s, with many variations on the lyrics. Bart Simpson sings this version on The Simpsons, the first time being in the episode "Simpsons Roasting on an Open Fire" (December 17, 1989).

Parodies or novelty versions of "Jingle Bells" have been recorded by many artists, and include Yogi Yorgesson's "Yingle Bells", Da Yoopers' "Rusty Chevrolet", Bucko and Champs' "Aussie Jingle Bells", The Three Stooges' "Jingle Bell Drag", and Jeff Dunham's "Jingle Bombs", performed in his "Achmed the Dead Terrorist" sketch. Another popular spoof of the song is "Pumpkin Bells", a "Pumpkin Carol" which celebrates Halloween and the "Great Pumpkin". It originated in The Peanuts Book of Pumpkin Carols, a booklet based on the Peanuts comic strip and published by Hallmark Cards in the 1960s.

The Australian "Aussie Jingle Bells" written by Colin Buchanan, broadly translates the idea of the original song to the summertime Christmas of the Southern hemisphere:

Aussie Jingle Bells

Dashing through the bush, in a rusty Holden ute,
Kicking up the dust, esky in the boot,
Kelpie by my side, singing Christmas songs,
It's Summer time and I am in my singlet, shorts and thongs

Oh! Jingle bells, jingle bells, jingle all the way,
Christmas in Australia on a scorching summers day, Hey!
Jingle bells, jingle bells, Christmas time is beaut!,
Oh what fun it is to ride in a rusty Holden ute.

Other verses add further details about what happens when the ute arrives at the family Christmas.

"Jingle Bell Rock" by Bobby Helms pays homage to "Jingle Bells", directly referencing the source song's lyrics, but with a different melody. Originally recorded and released by Helms in a rockabilly style, "Jingle Bell Rock" has itself since become a Christmas standard.

The first notes in the chorus have become a motif that has been inserted into recordings of other Christmas songs, most notably at the beginning and end of Bing Crosby's "It's Beginning to Look a Lot Like Christmas"; a guitar passage at the end of Nat King Cole's "The Christmas Song"; and Clarence Clemons performing a saxophone solo in the middle of Bruce Springsteen's "Merry Christmas Baby". A piano is also heard playing these notes at the end of Springsteen's version of "Santa Claus Is Comin' to Town". A slow version of the chorus opening forms the conclusion of Stan Freberg's 1957 "Green Chri$tma$", interspersed with cash-register noises. Mariah Carey utilizes a bit of the melody in her song "When Christmas Comes". Joni Mitchell's 1971 song "River" begins with a melancholy version of the chorus on piano. In 2010 the Israeli satirical website Latma produced a parody titled "Jihad Bells", where the Palestinian Minister of Uncontrollable Rage explains the persecution of Christians in the Muslim world.

Certifications

Frank Sinatra version

Michael Bublé and the Puppini Sisters version

See also
 List of Christmas carols

References

External links

 Search result for recordings, AllMusic
 Sheet music of "The One Horse Open Sleigh" at the Library of Congress
 The Story of "Jingle Bells" by Roger Lee Hall, New England Song Series No. 3
 Free arrangements for piano and voice from Cantorion.org
 James Lord Pierpont—discussion of the song's history, hymnsandcarolsofchristmas.com
 Complete lyrics and further details to "Jingle Bells", hymnsandcarolsofchristmas.com
 , 1941 film with Gloria Jean

1857 songs
American Christmas songs
Thanksgiving songs
1850s neologisms
Quotations from music